Ifridytes is a genus of ground beetles in the family Carabidae. This genus has a single species, Ifridytes mateui. It is found in Morocco.

References

Platyninae